The British Energy Efficiency Federation (or BEEF) was founded in 1996 by the United Kingdom Government to provide a forum for consultation between existing industry associations in the energy sector.

References

Business organisations based in the United Kingdom
Energy conservation in the United Kingdom
Energy industry organizations
1996 establishments in the United Kingdom
Organizations established in 1996